Wilfred White (30 March 1904 – 21 November 1995) was an English equestrian from the United Kingdom and Olympic champion. He won a gold medal in show jumping with the British team at the 1952 Summer Olympics in Helsinki.

References

External links

1905 births
1995 deaths
British male equestrians
Olympic equestrians of Great Britain
English Olympic medallists
Olympic bronze medallists for Great Britain
Olympic gold medallists for Great Britain
Equestrians at the 1952 Summer Olympics
Equestrians at the 1956 Summer Olympics
Olympic medalists in equestrian
Medalists at the 1956 Summer Olympics
Medalists at the 1952 Summer Olympics